is a passenger railway station in located in the city of Katano, Osaka Prefecture, Japan, operated by West Japan Railway Company (JR West).

Lines
Hoshida Station is served by the Katamachi Line (Gakkentoshi Line), and is located 27.1 kilometers from the starting point of the line at Kizu Station.

Station layout
The station has two opposed elevated side platforms with the station building underneath. The station has a Midori no Madoguchi staffed ticket office.

Platforms

Adjacent stations

History
The station was opened on 1 July 1898. 

Station numbering was introduced in March 2018 with Hoshida being assigned station number JR-H31.

Passenger statistics
In fiscal 2019, the station was used by an average of 8,145 passengers daily (boarding passengers only).

Surrounding area
Hoshida Citizen Center (Katano City Office Hoshida Branch Office)
Osaka Prefectural Kita Kawachi Satsuki High School
Katano City Hoshida Elementary School

References

External links

Official home page 

Railway stations in Japan opened in 1898
Railway stations in Osaka Prefecture
Katano, Osaka